Blue pimpernel is a common name for several plants and may refer to:

 Anagallis foemina
 Lysimachia monelli